Vernon Francis Wilcox CBE QC (10 April 1919 – 13 March 2004) was an Australian politician.  In a political career spanning twenty years, he represented the electorate of Camberwell in the Victorian Legislative Assembly and held many positions in the Victorian Cabinet.  He is best known today as the initiator of the Melbourne Underground Rail Loop, but also delivered a memorable speech to parliament in 1971 in favour of building a railway line to complement the Eastern Freeway.

Wilcox was born in Camberwell, a suburb of Melbourne.  He was educated at Carey Baptist Grammar School, where he won the "Henry Meeks Medal for Leadership, Scholarship and Athletics" in 1932 and 1935 and acted as School Captain from 1935 to 1936.  Wilcox maintained an interest in the school long after he graduated, and from 1963 to 1970 he served on the school council. After secondary school, Wilcox went on to study law at the University of Melbourne.  He matriculated shortly before the outbreak of World War II, and joined the Royal Australian Naval Volunteer Reserve, serving as a Lieutenant from 1942 to 1945.  During his time in the Navy, he worked as liaison officer to the United States of America's Seventh Fleet.  After the war, Wilcox put his degree into practice, joining his father's firm, Hall and Wilcox, in 1946.

In the 1940s, Wilcox became active in the Liberal Party but, in 1952, he contested the seat of Camberwell unsuccessfully, as a member of the break-away Electoral Reform Party. Back in the Liberal Party fold, he successfully contested Camberwell at a 1956 by-election. In 1964, he became a Cabinet Minister, being appointed Assistant Chief Secretary, Assistant Attorney-General, and Minister for Immigration.  In 1965, he remained Assistant Attorney-General, but replaced the other two portfolios with the role of Minister for Labour and Industry.  In 1967, he was made Minister for Transport, and in 1973, he became Attorney General.  Wilcox retired from Parliament in 1976.  Looking back over his career, he cited turning the first sod on the project to build the Melbourne Underground Rail Loop in June 1971 as his proudest memory.  In 2001, Wilcox wrote Minister for the Crown, in which he reflected on his life in pre-war Melbourne, and his career in politics as a member of the Bolte and Hamer Ministries.  The book's foreword was penned by Geoffrey Blainey.

In 1998, Wilcox was selected as a delegate to the fourth Constitutional Convention, running on a "Safeguard the People" ticket.  His mission at the Convention was to ensure that any modifications made to the Australian Constitution towards a Republic maintained the present checks and balances against Centralism and the power of the Executive and the Judiciary. He argued, "We have had a Constitution, rightly or wrongly, that has been significantly destabilised, a generation of young people ... who believe we have a bad Constitution, paradoxically, when it is in fact the best in the world."

Wilcox was a keen sportsman.  He played cricket as a wicket-keeper at university and later for Richmond Cricket Club, and in later life would be a trustee of the Melbourne Cricket Ground and maintained a long association with the Camberwell Magpies Cricket Club.  He was also involved for decades with the Returned and Services League of Australia and the Royal Agricultural Society of Victoria.  He was made Commander of the Order of the British Empire in 1976.  Wilcox married his wife Jean in 1942, and the couple had four children and thirteen grandchildren.  He died in 2004, at the age of 84.

Notes

References
Condolences: Hon. Vernon Francis Wilcox, CBE, QC, Victorian Parliamentary HANSARD (Legislative Council), 30 March 2004.
"Tunnels a lasting legacy", Richard Wilcox, The Australian, 26 May 2004.
"MP who kept Melbourne on track and in the loop", Natalie Sikora, Herald Sun, 15 April 2004
"Inspired by Machiavelli and Mac the Mouth", Claire Harvey, The Australian, 5 February 1998.

External links
Portrait of Vernon Wilcox, taken by Loui Seselja in 1998

1919 births
2004 deaths
Delegates to the Australian Constitutional Convention 1998
Members of the Victorian Legislative Assembly
Liberal Party of Australia members of the Parliament of Victoria
Attorneys-General of Victoria
Commanders of the Order of the British Empire
Politicians from Melbourne
People educated at Carey Baptist Grammar School
20th-century Australian politicians